Shovot, also Shavat, (/Шовот, شاۋات) is a town and seat of Shovot District in Xorazm Region in Uzbekistan. The town is located 37 km north-west of Urgench. It has a railway station on the line Turkmenabad - Beineu. The population was 20,600 in 1991, and 19,000 in 2016. It attained city status in 1981. It contains an Asphalt concrete plant.

References

Populated places in Xorazm Region
Urban-type settlements in Uzbekistan